Çılgın Bediş (English, Crazy Bediş) is a Turkish youth television series that first displayed in tv in 1996. The first part was published on Monday, July 8. From 1999 until 1996, Kanal D aired the series. In 2000 it shifted to a different channel, passed to the Show TV. The series ended in 2001. Yonca Evcimik has the leading role.

Cast
Main characters
 Yonca Evcimik as Çılgın Bediş
 Cenk Torun as Oktay
 Çiçek Dilligil as Mükü
 Selahattin Taşdöğen as Necmi Dede
 Sonay Aydın as Banu
 Sinan Bengier as Orhan (Bediş father)
 Selma Sonat as Canan (Bediş mother)
 Ayten Erman as Mefaret Hanım
 Gökhan Mete as Mustafa Koç
 Ayten Uncuoğlu as Müdire Nazime Hanım
 Zeynep Kaçar as Zeynep
 Gülçin Hatıhan as Başak
 Başak Sayan as Nesrin
 Dolunay Soysert as Mihrace
 Rıza Sönmez as Savaş
 Tuncer Sevi as Balıkçı Peyami
 Ahmet Özuğurlu as Durali
 Ercüment Balakoğlu as Bakkal Remzi

Seasons
 Season 1: episodes 1-52 (08.07.1996 - 28.07.1997)
 Season 2: episodes 53-62.(23.09.1997 - 29.12.1997)
 Season 3: episodes 63-65.(04.09.1999 - 18.09.1999)
 Season 4: episodes 66-70. 31.12.2000 - 03.03.2001)

External links
 http://www.sinematurk.com/film/41250-cilgin-bedis/
 https://www.imdb.com/title/tt1162451/

1996 Turkish television series debuts
1990s Turkish television series
Turkish comedy television series
Turkish drama television series
Kanal D original programming
Show TV original programming
2001 Turkish television series endings
Television shows set in Istanbul
Television series produced in Istanbul
Turkish television series endings
2000s Turkish television series